Justice George may refer to:

James Z. George (1826–1897), chief justice of the Supreme Court of Mississippi
Ronald M. George (born 1940), chief justice of the Supreme Court of California
Walter F. George (1878–1957), associate justice of the Supreme Court of Georgia